Wilson is a ghost town in Calvert County, Maryland, United States. Wilson appeared on USGS maps as late as 1901.

References

Geography of Calvert County, Maryland
Ghost towns in Maryland